Firecreek is a 1968 American Western film directed by Vincent McEveety and starring James Stewart and Henry Fonda in his second role as an antagonist that year alongside Sergio Leone's Once Upon a Time in the West. The film is similar to High Noon in that it features an entire town of cowards refusing to help a peace officer against outlaws. Stewart plays an unlikely hero, forced into action when his conscience will not permit evil to continue. The supporting cast features Inger Stevens, Dean Jagger, Ed Begley, Jay C. Flippen, Jack Elam and John Qualen.

Offscreen close friends Stewart and Fonda's first film together had been in a section of the episodic musical comedy On Our Merry Way two decades earlier, in which they played two musicians named "Slim" and "Lank," and they made The Cheyenne Social Club two years after Firecreek. They had also both appeared in How the West Was Won but had no scenes together despite their characters in the film being depicted as best friends.

Firecreek was partially filmed at North Ranch in Oak Park, California and Thousand Oaks, California.

Plot
After years of backing away from criminals and gunfights, one resident of the small western town of Firecreek decides to fight back. Part-time sheriff Johnny Cobb (James Stewart) decides to avenge the death of a young man against gunmen led by Bob Larkin (Henry Fonda).

Cobb has a lot on his mind, particularly with his wife Henrietta (Jacqueline Scott) about to give birth. He is a peace-loving farmer whose childishly made sheriff's badge is practically an honorary one.

Larkin's men ride into town and disrupt the peace. Earl (Gary Lockwood), Norman (Jack Elam), and Drew (James Best) run roughshod over the local citizens and Larkin has no inclination to stop it, despite Cobb's requests. Larkin is more interested in getting to know an attractive widow named Evelyn (Inger Stevens).

The only person in town willing to help Cobb is a slow-witted stable boy named Arthur (J. Robert Porter). When one of Larkin's men attacks a woman, Arthur kills the man.

Cobb's wife goes into labor and he has to leave town. While he is gone, Larkin's men hang Arthur and no one in the town tries to stop them.

Cobb returns to town to discover that Arthur has been hanged in the stable. He lowers the body, then demands that the apathetic shopkeeper eyewitness, Whittier, hand over his own gun. Cobb then goes after Larkin and his men, one of whom gets caught in a rope tied to his horse, which bolts off, dragging him. Cobb manages to kill the last two men in individual struggles, and then faces off against Larkin in the middle of the main street; Larkin easily outshoots Cobb and gives him the option of living if he stops his vendetta, but Cobb refuses to quit, Larkin prepares to kill Cobb but is shot with a rifle by the widow Evelyn from a 2nd-story window, as he is about to shoot Cobb.

Cast

 James Stewart as Johnny Cobb
 Henry Fonda as Bob Larkin
 Inger Stevens as Evelyn Pittman
 Jacqueline Scott as Henrietta Cobb
 Gary Lockwood as Earl
 Dean Jagger as Whittier
 Ed Begley as Preacher Broyles
 Jay C. Flippen as Mr. Pittman
 Jack Elam as Norman
 James Best as Drew
 BarBara Luna as Meli
 Brooke Bundy as Leah
 J. Robert Porter as Arthur
 Morgan Woodward as Willard
 John Qualen as Hall
 Louise Latham as Dulcie
 Athena Lorde as Mrs. Littlejohn

Critical reaction
Contemporary critical reaction to Firecreek was generally positive. Howard Thompson of The New York Times called it "a good, sturdy and occasionally powerful little Western", especially praising screenwriter Calvin Clements and claiming "James Stewart is plain wonderful and Henry Fonda almost matches him."  Roger Ebert of the Chicago Sun Times gave Firecreek three stars. However, despite the rating and praise for actors James Stewart, Jacqueline Scott, Henry Fonda and Inger Stevens, Ebert felt that "somehow the parts don't quite come together" and "things move at too leisurely a pace."

See also
 List of American films of 1968

References

External links
 
 
 
 

1968 films
1968 Western (genre) films
American Western (genre) films
1960s English-language films
Films directed by Vincent McEveety
Films scored by Alfred Newman
Warner Bros. films
1968 directorial debut films
Revisionist Western (genre) films
1960s American films